Dadda'to is an administrative district in Djibouti.

See also 

 Districts of Djibouti

References 

Districts of Djibouti